Thaxterogaster caesiophylloides is a species of fungus in family Cortinariaceae.

Taxonomy 
It was described as new to science in 2014 and classified as Cortinarius caesiophylloides. It was placed in the (subgenus Phlegmacium) of the large mushroom genus Cortinarius.

In 2022 the species was transferred from Cortinarius and reclassified as Thaxterogaster caesiophylloides based on genomic data.

Etymology 
The specific epithet caesiophylloides alludes to both its similarity to Cortinarius multiformis var. caesiophyllus (now named C. caesiolamellatus), and the bluish tints in the gills.

Habitat and distribution 
Found in Fennoscandia, where it grows on the ground in mesic coniferous forests. It has since been found in Slovakia.

See also

List of Cortinarius species

References

External links

caesiophylloides
Fungi described in 2014
Fungi of Europe